The Billabong Creek, a partly perennial stream of the Murray River catchment within the Murray-Darling basin, is located in the Riverina region of New South Wales, Australia.

At  (with some estimates ranging up to ), Billabong Creek is believed to be the longest creek in the world.

Course and features
Formed by the confluence of the Yarra Yarra Creek and Little Billabong Creek, Billabong Creek rises on the Great Dividing Range, north of Holbrook, and flows generally west, northwest, and west, joined by sixteen minor tributaries before reaching its confluence with the Edward River, at Moulamein. The creek descends  over its  course.

From source to mouth, the creek passes through the towns of Morven, Culcairn, Walbundrie, Rand, Jerilderie, Conargo, Wanganella, and Moulamein.

Gallery

See also 

 List of rivers of New South Wales (A-K)
 Rivers of New South Wales

References

External links

 
 Map of the Billabong Creek NSW Murray Wetlands Working Group

Rivers of New South Wales
Murray-Darling basin
Rivers in the Riverina